Geddy Lee  (born Gary Lee Weinrib; July 29, 1953) is a Canadian musician, best known as the lead vocalist, bassist, and keyboardist for the rock group Rush. Lee joined the band in September 1968, at the request of his childhood friend Alex Lifeson, replacing original bassist and frontman Jeff Jones.  Lee's solo effort, My Favourite Headache, was released in 2000.

An award-winning musician, Lee's style, technique, and skill on the bass have inspired many rock musicians such as Cliff Burton of Metallica, Steve Harris of Iron Maiden, John Myung of Dream Theater, Les Claypool of Primus, Steve Di Giorgio of Sadus, Death and Testament, and Tim Commerford of Rage Against the Machine and Audioslave. Along with his Rush bandmates – guitarist Alex Lifeson and drummer Neil Peart – Lee was made an Officer of the Order of Canada on May 9, 1996. The trio was the first rock band to be so honoured as a group. In 2013, the group was inducted into the Rock and Roll Hall of Fame after 14 years' eligibility; they were nominated overwhelmingly in the Hall's first selection via fan ballot. In 2006, Lee was ranked 13th by Hit Parader on their list of the 100 Greatest Heavy Metal Vocalists of All Time.

Early life
Lee was born on July 29, 1953, in the North York neighbourhood of Willowdale, Toronto, to Morris Weinrib (born Moshe Meir Weinrib; August 5, 1920 – October 8, 1965), from Ostrowce, and Mary "Manya" Rubinstein (born Malka Rubinstein; July 16, 1925 – July 2, 2021), who was born in Warsaw and later grew up in Wierzbnik. His parents were Jewish Holocaust survivors from Poland who had survived the ghetto in Starachowice (where they met), followed by their imprisonments at Auschwitz and later Dachau and Bergen-Belsen  concentration camps during the Holocaust and World War II. They were in their teens when they were initially imprisoned at Auschwitz. "It was kind of surreal pre-teen shit", says Lee, describing how his father bribed guards to bring his mother shoes. After a period, his mother was transferred to Bergen-Belsen and his father to Dachau. When the war ended four years later, and the Allies liberated the camps, Morris set out in search of Manya and found her at a Bergen-Belsen displaced persons camp. They married there and eventually emigrated to Canada.

Lee's father died young, which forced Lee's mother to work to support three children, running the Newmarket, Ontario variety store that her husband had owned and managed. Lee feels that not having parents at home during those years was probably a factor in his becoming a musician: "It was a terrible blow that I lost him, but the course of my life changed because my mother couldn't control us." He said that losing his father at such an early age made him aware of how "quickly life can disappear", which inspired him from then on to get the most out of his life and music.

He turned his basement into practice space for a band he formed with high-school friends. After the band began earning income from small performances at high-school shows or other events, he decided to drop out of high school and play rock and roll professionally. His mother was devastated when he told her, and he still feels that he owes her for the disappointments in her life. "All the shit I put her through", he says, "on top of the fact that she just lost her husband. I felt like I had to make sure that it was worth it. I wanted to show her that I was a professional, that I was working hard, and wasn't just a fuckin' lunatic."

Jweekly featured Lee's reflections on his mother's experiences as a refugee and of his own Jewish heritage. Lee's name, Geddy, was derived from his mother's heavy Polish accented pronunciation of his given first name, Gary. This was picked up by his friends in school, leading Lee to adopt it as his stage name and later his legal name. Earlier, another language-related mistake was made as Geddy started school - Lee was incorrectly registered as Lorne, making Geddy believe his name was Gary Lorne Weinrib.

After Rush had become a widely recognized rock group, Lee told the story about his mother's early life to the group's drummer and lyricist, Neil Peart, who then wrote the lyrics to "Red Sector A", inspired by her ordeal. The song, for which Lee wrote the music, was released on the band's 1984 album Grace Under Pressure. The lyrics include the following verse:

Music career

Early years
Lee began playing music in school when he was 10 or 11 and got his first acoustic guitar at 14. In school, he first played drums, trumpet and clarinet. However, learning to play instruments in school wasn't satisfying to Lee, and he took basic piano lessons independently. His interest increased dramatically after listening to some of the popular rock groups at the time. His early influences included Jack Bruce of Cream, John Entwistle of The Who, Jeff Beck, and Procol Harum. "I was mainly interested in early British progressive rock", said Lee. "That's how I learned to play bass, emulating Jack Bruce and people like that." Bruce's style of music was also noticed by Lee, who liked that "his sound was distinctive – it wasn't boring." Lee has also been influenced by Paul McCartney, Chris Squire, and James Jamerson.

In 1969, Rush began playing professionally in coffeehouses, high school dances and at various outdoor recreational events. By 1971, they were now playing primarily original songs in small clubs and bars, including Toronto's Gasworks and Abbey Road Pub. Lee describes the group during these early years as being "weekend warriors". They were holding down jobs during the weekdays and playing music on weekends: "We longed to break out of the boring surrounding of the suburbs and the endless similarities . . . the shopping plazas and all that stuff. . . the music was a vehicle for us to speak out." He claims that in the beginning, they were simply "a straightforward rock band."

Short of money, they began opening concerts at venues such as Toronto's Victory Burlesque Theatre for the glam rock band New York Dolls. By 1972, Rush began performing full-length concerts, mainly consisting of original songs, in cities including Toronto and Detroit. As they gained more recognition, they began performing as an opening act for groups such as Aerosmith, Kiss, and Blue Öyster Cult.

Style
Like Cream, Rush followed the model of a "power trio", with Lee playing bass and singing. Lee's vocals produced a distinctive, "countertenor" falsetto and resonant sound.  Lee possessed a three-octave vocal range, from baritone through tenor, alto, and mezzo-soprano pitch ranges, although it has significantly decreased with age. Lee's playing style is widely regarded for his use of high treble and very hard playing of the strings and for utilizing the bass as a lead instrument, often contrapuntal to Lifeson's guitar. In the 1970s and early 1980s, Lee mostly used a Rickenbacker 4001 bass, with a very noticeable grit in his tone. According to Lee, during the band's "synth era" in the mid-1980s, Lee used Steinberger and later Wal basses, with the latter having more of a "jazzy" tone. From 1993's Counterparts onward, Lee began using the Fender Jazz Bass almost exclusively, returning to his trademark high treble sound. Lee had first used the Jazz Bass to record  Moving Pictures on songs such as "Tom Sawyer."

Rising popularity
After several early albums and increasing popularity, Rush's status as a rock group soared over the following five years as they consistently toured worldwide and produced successful albums, including 2112 (1976), A Farewell to Kings (1977), Hemispheres (1978), Permanent Waves (1980), and Moving Pictures (1981).  Lee began adding synthesizers in 1977, with the release of A Farewell to Kings. The additional sounds expanded the group's "textural capabilities", states keyboard critic Greg Armbruster and allowed the trio to produce an orchestrated and more complex progressive rock music style. It also gave Lee the ability to play bass simultaneously, as he could control the synthesizer with foot pedals. In 1981, he won  Keyboard magazine's poll as "Best New Talent." By the 1984 album Grace Under Pressure, Lee was surrounding himself with stacks of keyboards on stage.

By the 1980s, Rush had become one of the "biggest rock bands on the planet", selling out arena seats when touring. Lee was known for his dynamic stage movements. According to music critic Tom Mulhern, writing in 1980, "it's dazzling to see so much sheer energy expended without a nervous breakdown." By 1996, their Test for Echo Tour began performing without an opening act, their shows lasting nearly three hours.

Music industry writer Christopher Buttner, who interviewed Lee in 1996, described him as a prodigy and "role model" for what every musician wants to be, noting his proficiency on stage. Buttner cited Lee's ability to vary time signatures, play multiple keyboards, use bass pedal controllers and control sequencers, all while singing lead vocals into as many as three microphones. Buttner adds that few musicians of any instrument "can juggle half of what Geddy can do without literally falling on their ass." As a result, notes Mulhern, Lee's instrumentation was the "pulse" of the group and created a "one-man rhythm section", which complemented guitarist Alex Lifeson and percussionist Neil Peart. Bass instructor Allan Slutsky, or "Dr Licks", credits Lee's "biting, high-end bass lines and creative synthesizer work" for helping the group become "one of the most innovative" of all the groups that play arena rock. By 1989, Guitar Player magazine had designated Lee the "Best Rock Bass" player from their reader's poll for the previous five years.

Bass players who have cited Lee as an influence include Cliff Burton of Metallica, Steve Harris of Iron Maiden, John Myung of Dream Theater, Les Claypool of Primus, and Steve Di Giorgio of Sadus, Death and Testament.

My Favourite Headache
My Favourite Headache, Lee's first and to-date only solo album, was released on November 14, 2000, while Rush was on a hiatus following the deaths of Neil Peart's daughter and wife. Musicians associated with the project included friend and Rush collaborator Ben Mink, Soundgarden and Pearl Jam drummer Matt Cameron, and others.

Side projects

The bulk of Lee's work in music has been with Rush (see Rush discography). However, Lee has also contributed to a body of work outside of his involvement with the band through guest appearances and album production. In 1980, Lee was brought in to produce Toronto-based band Wireless who had previously opened up for Rush and were on the verge of breaking up. With Lee at the helm, the group recorded their third and final album, No Static, released on Rush's label, Anthem Records.

In 1981, Lee was the featured guest for the hit song "Take Off" and its included comedic commentary with Bob and Doug McKenzie (played by Rick Moranis and Dave Thomas, respectively) for the McKenzie Brothers' comedy album Great White North, which was released on Rush's Anthem label. While Rush has had great success selling albums, "Take Off" is the highest-charting single on the Billboard Hot 100 of Lee's career.

In 1982, Lee produced the first (and only) album from Toronto's new wave band Boys Brigade. On the 1985 album We Are the World, by humanitarian consortium USA for Africa, Lee recorded guest vocals for the song "Tears Are Not Enough". Lee sang "O Canada", the Canadian national anthem,  at Baltimore's Camden Yards for the 1993 Major League Baseball All-Star Game.

Another version of "O Canada", with a rock arrangement, was recorded by Lee and Lifeson for the 1999 film soundtrack South Park: Bigger, Longer, and Uncut.

Lee also plays bass on Canadian rock band I Mother Earth's track "Good for Sule", which is featured on the group's 1999 album Blue Green Orange.

Lee was an interview subject in the documentary films Metal: A Headbangers Journey and Rush: Beyond the Lighted Stage, and has appeared in multiple episodes of the VH1 Classic series Metal Evolution.

Along with his bandmates, Lee was a guest musician on the Max Webster song "Battle Scar", from the 1980 album Universal Juveniles.

Lee appeared in Broken Social Scene's music video for their 2006 single "Fire Eye'd Boy", judging the band while performing various musical tasks. In 2006, Lee joined Lifeson's supergroup, the Big Dirty Band, to provide songs accompanying Trailer Park Boys: The Movie.

In 2013, Lee made a brief cameo appearance as himself in the How I Met Your Mother season eight episode "P.S. I Love You".

In 2015, Lee and bandmate Alex Lifeson appeared in the series Chicago Fire, season 4, episode 6, called "2112".

In 2017, Lee performed in place of late bassist Chris Squire with Yes during the band's Rock and Roll Hall of Fame induction, playing bass for the song "Roundabout."

In 2018, Lee published Geddy Lee's Big Beautiful Book of Bass, which highlights his collection of over 250 basses along with interviews with some of the leading bass players and bass technicians.

In 2020, Lee provided guest vocals to an all-star Canadian rendition of the late Bill Withers song "Lean on Me" during the TV special Stronger Together, Tous Ensemble, a Canadian benefit performance simulcast by every major television network in Canada as a benefit for Food Banks Canada during the COVID-19 pandemic.

In September 2021, Barenaked Ladies frontman Ed Robertson revealed that Barenaked Ladies are working on a "secret project" with Lee.

In 2022, he appeared as a guest star playing Thomas Sawyer on the acclaimed long-running CBC period drama Murdoch Mysteries.

In August 2022, Lee appeared at the South Park 25th Anniversary Concert with Alex Lifeson and performed Rush's "Closer to the Heart" with the members of the band Primus and South Park co-creator Matt Stone.

Collections
Lee is a collector, and has collected baseball ephemera, vintage bass guitars, and wines, with a collection of 5,000 bottles. As a child he claims to have collected stamps, and vinyl records. He went on to collect first edition books. He then also began collecting 6-string guitars.

Baseball
Lee is also a longtime baseball fan. His favourite team while growing up was the Detroit Tigers, and he later became a fan of the Toronto Blue Jays after they were established. In the 1980s, Lee began reading the works of Bill James, particularly The Bill James Baseball Abstracts, which led to an interest in sabermetrics and participation in a fantasy baseball keeper league. He collects baseball memorabilia, once donating part of his collection to the Negro Leagues Baseball Museum, and threw the ceremonial first pitch to inaugurate the 2013 Toronto Blue Jays season. Lee sang the Canadian national anthem before the 1993 MLB All-Star Game. In 2016, Lee planned to produce an independent film about baseball in Italy.

Guitars
Lee also collects guitars and basses late in his career. He has a collection of over 250 vintage basses. He owns a 1961 Fender Precision Bass previously owned by John Entwistle of The Who. He also owns two 1964 rare color (decoder red) Fender Jazz Basses.

In 2019 he sent several of his guitars to Mecum Auctions including a 1959 Les Paul Standard, a 1960 Gibson ES-345, a 1955 Fender Stratocaster, a 1960 Gibson ES-335, a 1965 Gibson ES-335 and a 1967 Gibson Flying V.

Other
Lee is also an avid watch collector.

Equipment used
Lee has varied his equipment list continually throughout his career.

Basses

In 1998, Fender released the Geddy Lee Jazz Bass, available in Black and 3-Color Sunburst (as of 2009). This signature model is a recreation of Lee's favourite bass, a 1972 Fender Jazz that he bought in a pawn shop in Kalamazoo, Michigan in 1978. In 2015, Fender released a revised USA model of his signature bass.

In Rush's early years, Lee's main instrument was a Fender Precision Bass, which he used on the band's debut album in 1974. He later had this bass sanded down into a teardrop shape and refinished with a Jazz Bass bridge pickup added, something which he regretted in later years. He subsequently switched to a modified Rickenbacker 4001, which made its first appearance on Fly by Night (1975). He used his Fender Jazz Bass alongside the Rickenbacker on the albums Permanent Waves (1980), Moving Pictures (1981) and Signals (1982) before moving to it exclusively from Counterparts (1993) onwards. He had also used Steinberger basses on Grace Under Pressure (1984) and Wal basses on Power Windows (1985), Hold Your Fire (1987), Presto (1989) and Roll the Bones (1991).

Lee has been a longtime user of RotoSound strings. He uses Swing Bass RS66LD (.45-.105) on a majority of his basses, but used Funkmaster FM66 (.30-.90) on his Wal basses from 1985 to 1992.

Bass amplification
For Rush's 2010 tour, Lee used two Orange AD200 bass heads together with two OBC410 4x10 bass cabinets.

Keyboards and synthesizers

Over the years, Lee has used synthesizers from Oberheim (8-voice, OB-1, OB-X, OB-Xa), PPG (Wave 2.2 and 2.3), Roland (Jupiter 8, D-50, XV-5080, and Fantom X7), Moog (Minimoog, Taurus pedals, Little Phatty), and Yamaha (DX7, KX76). Lee used sequencers early in their development and has continued to use similar innovations as they have developed over the years. Lee has also made use of digital samplers. Combined, these electronic devices have supplied many memorable keyboard sounds, such as the "growl" in "Tom Sawyer" and the percussive melody in the chorus of "The Spirit of Radio."

Following Hold Your Fire (1987), Rush gradually phased the keyboard and synthesizer-derived sounds in their compositions away, with Vapor Trails (2002) marking their first album since Caress of Steel (1975) not to feature any keyboards or synthesizers. On Snakes & Arrows (2007), Lee sparingly adds a Mellotron and bass pedals. On Clockwork Angels (2012), keyboards were used to enhance several compositions once again.

Live performances: special equipment

Recreating unique sounds
Newer advances in synthesizer and sampler technology have allowed Lee to store familiar sounds from his old synthesizers alongside new ones in combination synthesizer/samplers, such as the Roland XV-5080. For live shows in 2002 and 2004, Lee and his keyboard technician used the playback capabilities of the XV-5080 to generate virtually all of Rush's keyboard sounds to date and additional complex sound passages that previously required several machines at once to produce.

When playing live, Lee and his bandmates recreate their songs as accurately as possible with digital samplers. Using these samplers, the band members can recreate, in real-time, the sounds of non-traditional instruments, accompaniments, vocal harmonies, and other sound "events" that are familiar to those who have heard Rush songs from their albums.

To trigger these sounds in real-time, Lee uses MIDI controllers, placed at the locations on the stage where he has a microphone stand. Lee uses two types of MIDI controllers: one type resembles a traditional synthesizer keyboard on a stand (Yamaha KX76). The second type is a large foot-pedal keyboard placed on the stage floor (Korg MPK-130, Roland PK-5). Combined, they enable Lee to use his free hands and feet to trigger sounds in electronic equipment that has been placed off-stage. With this technology Lee and his bandmates can present their arrangements in a live setting with the level of complexity and fidelity that fans have come to expect and without the need to resort to the use of backing tracks or employing an additional band member.  During the Clockwork Angels Tour, a notable exception was when a string ensemble played string parts, originally arranged and conducted by David Campbell on Clockwork Angels.

Lee's (and his bandmates') use of MIDI controllers to trigger sampled instruments and audio events is visible throughout the R30: 30th Anniversary World Tour concert DVD (2005).

Lee used a Roland Fantom X7 and a Moog Little Phatty synthesizer from the Snakes and Arrows tour onwards.

Unique stage equipment

In 1996, Lee stopped using traditional bass amplifiers on stage, opting to have the bass guitar signals input directly to the touring front-of-house console to improve control and sound definition. He began using Tech 21 SansAmp units after experimenting with one in the studio intended for Alex Lifeson's guitar and eventually received signature models from the company, most notably the GED-2112 rackmount. Faced with the dilemma of what to do with the empty space left behind by the lack of large amplifier cabinets, Lee chose to decorate his side of the stage with unusual items.

For the 1996–1997 Test for Echo Tour, Lee's side sported a fully stocked old-fashioned household refrigerator. For the 2002 Vapor Trails tour, Lee lined his side of the stage with three coin-operated Maytag dryers. Other large appliances appeared later in the same space. They were "miked" by the sound crew for visual effects, just as a real amplifier would be. The stage crew loaded the dryers with specially-designed Rush-themed T-shirts, different from the shirts on sale to the general public. At the close of each show, Lee and Lifeson tossed these T-shirts into the audience. The dryers can be seen while watching the Rush in Rio DVD, the R40 DVD, and the R30: 30th Anniversary World Tour DVD. For the band's R30 tour, one of the three dryers was replaced with a rotating shelf-style vending machine. It, too, was fully stocked and operational during shows. For the R40 Tour in 2015, four dryers were used instead of three for the show's portions that featured them onstage.

The Snakes & Arrows Tour prominently featured three Henhouse brand rotisserie chicken ovens on stage complete with an attendant in a chef's hat and apron to "tend" the chickens during shows. For the 2010–2011 Time Machine Tour, Lee's side of the stage featured a steampunk-inspired combination Time Machine and Sausage Maker. An attendant was occasionally throwing material into its feed hopper during the show. During the 2012–2013 Clockwork Angels Tour, Lee used a different steampunk device called a "Geddison" as a backdrop. This was composed of a giant old-style phonograph horn, an oversized model brain in a jar, a set of brass horns, and a working popcorn popper. The 2015 R40 tour combined several of these elements, except for the chicken ovens used on the Snakes and Arrows tour.

Awards
 Bass Hall of Fame – Guitar Player magazine
 Six-time winner: "Best Rock Bass" – Guitar Player magazine
 1993: "Best Rock Bass Player" Bass Player magazine's readers' poll
 1994: With Rush, inducted into the Juno Hall of Fame
 1996: Officer of the Order of Canada, along with bandmates Alex Lifeson and Neil Peart
 2007: Best Album for Bass (Snakes & Arrows) – Bass Player magazine
 "Coolest Bass Line in a Song" (for "Malignant Narcissism") – Bass Player magazine
 "Best 2007 Cover Feature" for "Northern Warrior" – Bass Player magazine
 2010: With Rush, "Living Legend" – Classic Rock Magazine
 2010: With Rush, Star on the Hollywood Walk of Fame
 2012: Queen Elizabeth II Diamond Jubilee Medal
 2013: With Rush, Rock and Roll Hall of Fame inductee
 2014: Awarded an honorary doctorate from Nipissing University in North Bay, Ontario (along with Neil Peart, and Alex Lifeson)
 2021:  Lifetime Achievement Award for his philanthropic work at the Artists for Peace and Justice (APJ) annual gala in Toronto on September 11.

Personal life
Lee married Nancy Young in 1976. They have a son, Julian, and a daughter, Kyla. He takes annual trips to France, where he indulges in cheese and wine. In 2011, a charitable foundation he supports, Grapes for Humanity, created the Geddy Lee Scholarship for winemaking students at Niagara College. Lee has described himself as a Jewish atheist, explaining to an interviewer, "I consider myself a Jew as a race, but not so much as a religion. I'm not down with religion at all. I'm a Jewish atheist, if that's possible."

References

External links

 Rush official website
 A colourful Geddy interview, w/ Nardwuar the Human Serviette
 Interview with Geddy Lee on his parents' experience in the Holocaust
 Mid-career interview with Mark Crampton 
 Geddy Lee Interview on The Hour with George Stroumboulopoulos
 Geddy Lee Interview  in SPIN
 Order of Canada citation

Living people
1953 births
20th-century atheists
20th-century Canadian bass guitarists
20th-century Canadian keyboardists
20th-century Canadian male musicians
20th-century Canadian male writers
20th-century Canadian multi-instrumentalists
20th-century Canadian male singers
21st-century atheists
21st-century Canadian bass guitarists
21st-century Canadian keyboardists
21st-century Canadian male musicians
21st-century Canadian male writers
21st-century Canadian multi-instrumentalists
21st-century Canadian male singers
Anthem Records artists
Atlantic Records artists
Baseball memorabilia
Big Dirty Band members
Canadian atheists
Canadian collectors
Canadian hard rock musicians
Canadian heavy metal bass guitarists
Canadian heavy metal singers
Canadian people of Polish-Jewish descent
Canadian record producers
Canadian rock bass guitarists
Canadian rock keyboardists
Canadian rock singers
Canadian songwriters
Canadian tenors
Countertenors
Heavy metal producers
Jewish atheists
Jewish Canadian musicians
Jewish heavy metal musicians
Jewish rock musicians
Jewish singers
Jewish songwriters
Male bass guitarists
Mercury Records artists
Musicians from Toronto
Officers of the Order of Canada
People from Willowdale, Toronto
Progressive rock bass guitarists
Progressive rock keyboardists
Rock songwriters
Rush (band) members